Rello is a municipality located in the province of Soria, Castile and León, Spain. According to the 2004 census (INE), the municipality has a population of 33 inhabitants.

References

Bibliography 
Alice Becker-Ho, Là s'en vont les seigneuries, photos by Emmanuel Rioufol, 2003.
 

Municipalities in the Province of Soria